Autotelic is a Filipino indie-alternative rock band in Manila, Philippines. Formed in 2012, the band consists of Josh Villena (guitars and vocals), Neil Tin (guitars), EJ Edralin (synth), Timothy “Pabs” Vargas (bass guitars), and Gep Macadaeg (drums). The band is currently signed with independent record label Nemesis Music Group, and major record label MCA Music.

History 
Autotelic started when Neil Tin, the band’s guitarist, spoke to Josh Villena. Villena is the band’s composer, lead vocalist, and guitarist. The band, which then consisted of Villena, Tin, Pabs Villegas (bassist), and Gep Macadaeg (drummer), who first met at a fast-food court. That is where they started to make music on a synthesis of Japanese and alternative rock and dance music.

Eventually, Eric Tubon, the keyboardist joined the band. He is also with the progressive rock band Fuseboxx. Then later, singer-songwriter Kai Honasan replaced Tubon as their keyboard player, while EJ Edralin later joined the band playing synths. The first song on which they worked with Honasan is the album’s first single, “Dahilan".

Coke Studio PH collaborations 
Autotelic collaborated with Sugarfree's former lead vocalist Ebe Dancel for Coke Studio PH. The band played Sugarfree's "Bawat Daan" while Ebe Dancel played Autotelic's "Dahilan". They ended the episode with their collaborated song "Bahagi".

Discography

Albums
Papunta Pabalik (2016)

Extended plays
Autotelic (2014)
Takipsilim (2018)

Compilations
Fresh Filter: Volume 1 (2015)

Singles
"Misteryoso"
"Dahilan"
"Close Your Eyes" (2015)
"Gising" (2016)
"Laro" (2016)
"Languyin" (2017)
"Bahagi"  (Coke Studio Philippines, 2017)
"Takipsilim" (2018)
"Ikaw" (2020)
"Bago" (2020)
"Kwentuhan" (2021)
"Iwan" (2021)

Accolades

References

External links

Filipino rock music groups
Musical groups from Metro Manila
Musical groups established in 2012
2012 establishments in the Philippines
MCA Music Inc. (Philippines) artists